Michael Marshall Dokes (August 10, 1958 – August 11, 2012) was an American professional boxer who competed from 1976 to 1997, and held the WBA heavyweight title from 1982 to 1983. As an amateur he won a silver medal in the heavyweight division at the 1975 Pan American Games.

Amateur career
Dokes won a silver medal at the 1975 Pan American Games. He lost a 5-0 decision to Teófilo Stevenson in the finals. He also lost a close decision to John Tate in the Olympic trials in 1976, after which he turned professional.

Amateur accomplishments
1975 National AAU Heavyweight Champion
1976 National Golden Gloves Heavyweight Champion, beating future pro champs John Tate and Greg Page en route.
As an underage 15-year-old, made it to the finals of both the 1974 National Golden Gloves and the National AAU tournaments. He lost to Leon Spinks in AAU final, and future Mike Tyson trainer Bobby Stewart in the Golden Gloves final.
Won 1974 North American championships.
Beat Marvin Stinson, who won the 1976 National AAU Heavyweight Championship.

Professional career
Dokes turned professional in 1976. He received national exposure in a televised exhibition with Muhammad Ali in 1977, which saw Ali clown and mug while slipping Dokes' punches, but also revealed glimpses of Dokes' potential. He came to real prominence in 1979 by defeating veteran contender Jimmy Young. His career faltered slightly after fighting to a draw with Ossie Ocasio, but Dokes returned to knock out Ocasio in one round soon thereafter. By early 1982, after a first-round knockout of Lynn Ball to win the NABF title, Dokes was in line for a title shot. He was ranked #2 by the WBC and #3 by the WBA. Dokes became WBA heavyweight champion in 1982 by knocking out Mike Weaver in the first round in a match held weeks after the Ray Mancini-Duk Koo Kim lightweight title fight that ended in Kim's death. Because of Nevada State Athletic Commission instructions to referee Joey Curtis regarding the stoppage of the fight in light of the incident, some felt it was premature. In the rematch, Dokes retained his title on a majority draw (tie).

Dokes' reign as the WBA title holder was short-lived. He lost his title by a tenth-round knockout to Gerrie Coetzee. He was later knocked out by future champion Evander Holyfield.

Dokes was knocked out by Donovan Ruddock in 1990. In 1993, Dokes faced newly crowned heavyweight champion Riddick Bowe in his first title defense since defeating Evander Holyfield. Bowe won by TKO in the first round. Although Dokes and his team protested that the fight was stopped prematurely, it was obvious that Dokes was in no condition to continue after taking a vicious barrage of punches from the heavy-hitting Bowe. After a nearly three-year hiatus, Dokes returned to the ring winning three of five matches over a two-year period before retiring for good in 1997.

Life after boxing
In 1999 Dokes was sentenced to between four and 15 years in prison after being convicted of an attack on his fiancée in August 1998. Late in 2008, Dokes was released on parole. Dokes died of liver cancer at a hospice in Akron in August 2012, a day after his 54th birthday.

Professional boxing record

Exhibition boxing record

References

External links

1958 births
2012 deaths
20th-century African-American sportspeople
21st-century African-American people
African-American boxers
American male boxers
American prisoners and detainees
Boxers from Ohio
Deaths from cancer in Ohio
Deaths from liver cancer
Sportspeople from Akron, Ohio
World heavyweight boxing champions
World Boxing Association champions
National Golden Gloves champions
Winners of the United States Championship for amateur boxers
Boxers at the 1975 Pan American Games
Pan American Games silver medalists for the United States
Pan American Games medalists in boxing
Medalists at the 1975 Pan American Games